Elena Antoci (née Buhăianu, divorced Iagăr; born 16 January 1975 in Braşov) is a Romanian middle distance runner who specializes in the 1500 metres.
She was European champion at European Indoor Championships in the 1500m event (2005) and European vicechampion at European Indoor Championships in the 1500m event (2002).

Achievements

Personal bests
800 metres - 1:59.43 min (2004)
1500 metres - 4:02.90 min (2002)

References

External links

1975 births
Living people
Doping cases in athletics
Romanian female middle-distance runners
Romanian sportspeople in doping cases
Athletes (track and field) at the 2000 Summer Olympics
Athletes (track and field) at the 2004 Summer Olympics
Olympic athletes of Romania
Sportspeople from Brașov
Universiade medalists in athletics (track and field)
Universiade gold medalists for Romania
Competitors at the 2001 Summer Universiade
Medalists at the 1999 Summer Universiade